Henry Hyde (1924–2007) was an American politician.

Henry Hyde may also refer to:
Henry Hyde (died 1634) (1563–1634), English politician and lawyer
Henry Hyde (Royalist) (c. 1605–1650), Royalist executed by Parliament in 1650
Henry Hyde, 2nd Earl of Clarendon (1638–1709), English aristocrat and politician
Henry Hyde, 4th Earl of Clarendon (1672–1753),English nobleman and politician
Henry Hyde, Viscount Cornbury (1710–1753), British author and politician
Henry Baldwin Hyde (1834–1899), founder of an insurance company
Henry J. Hyde (Medal of Honor) (1846–1893), Medal of Honor recipient during the Indian Wars
Henry Hyde (priest) (1854–1932), Archdeacon of Madras

See also
Harry Hyde (1925–1996), NASCAR